Superior is a creator-owned comic book series written by Mark Millar and illustrated by Leinil Francis Yu. It is published by Marvel Comics under the company's Icon imprint.

Synopsis  
Simon Pooni, an angry, bitter 12-year-old boy with multiple sclerosis, idolizes superheroes, particularly Superior, a Superman analogue. An alien monkey named Ormon appears at Simon's bedside, informing the boy that of all the people on Earth, he has been granted the honor of being bestowed a single magic wish. Simon is then transformed into Superior.

After playing the role of Superior for a week, he learns that Ormon is actually a demon incarnate, and he must sell his soul to the devil in order to remain as Superior. He is given 24 hours to decide, and is returned to his old body. The demon approaches an old bully of Simon, and offers him a similar wish, to become Superior's fictional nemesis, Abraxas; the only caveat is that he must pledge himself to Satan. Simon must then choose whether to become Superior again and save the planet from imminent destruction at the cost of his own soul.
 
To force Simon to choose, Abraxas begins destroying the city. Simon transforms into Superior and fights both Abraxas and Ormon. Although Superior defeats them in battle, Ormon gloats that he still has Simon's soul, until he realizes that Simon (as Superior) is immortal, and that his soul can never be collected. Ormon is dragged back to Hell as punishment for his failure, and Simon reverts to his mortal form. The world honors Superior as a fallen hero, thinking him killed in battle, and Simon returns to his former life, but now at peace with himself.

Promotion 
 
Prior to the release of the series, a marketing campaign featuring a Wizard magazine cover and a series of prophetic teaser images – all of which evoked Millar's love for the Superman mythos – were released. Creator Mark Millar also gave comic stores across the world a chance to earn a free full-page advert in the book's first issue by printing off and displaying promotional posters from his official website in their stores.
A charity auction was held to name the main character. The winner, Simon Pooni, chose his own name.

World record

In April 2011, Mark Millar, Leinil Francis Yu, Frank Quitely, Dave Gibbons, John Romita Jr., Paul Cornell, Andy Diggle, Jock, Duncan Fegredo, Sean Phillips and over fifty other comic book creators collaborated at the inaugural Kapow Comic Convention and used the Superior character to break two Guinness World Records - the fastest comic book ever produced and the biggest number of creators working on a single comic. The Superior World Record Special was written, penciled, inked and lettered in less than 12 hours and sold as a limited 10,000 copy book with all proceeds from its sales going to Yorkhill Sick Children's Hospital in Scotland.

Film
In Kick-Ass 2 there is a poster of Superior in a flashback of Dave's childhood.

20th Century Fox picked up the rights to a feature film in April 2014. Fox hired Brandon and Phillip Murphy to write the film's script while Matthew Vaughn and Tarquin Pack were to produce the film. Millar tweeted that he would like to see John Cena cast as Superior.

References

External links

Interviews

Reviews
 
 

Marvel Comics limited series
2010 comics debuts
2012 comics endings
Comics set in New York City
Superhero comics
Demons in comics
Fiction about size change
Works about disability